Sea Shells is an album by jazz singer Peggy Lee that was released in 1958.

Track listing
"Sea Fever" (Friedrich Silcher, Eleanor Chaffee)  – 2:03
"Nine Thorny Thickets" (Rolfe Humphries, Johnny Mercer)  – 4:59
"Little Old Car" (Henry Beau, Peggy Lee)  – 1:11
"Greensleeves" (Traditional)  – 1:58
Chinese Love Poems: "The Fisherman"/"Autumn Evening" (Li Po)/(Po)  – 2:18
"The Happy Monks" (Lee)  – 1:00
"The White Birch and the Sycamore" (Lee, Willard Robison, Hubert Wheeler)  – 4:00
"Of Such Is the Kingdom of God" (Ernest Holmes, Irma Glenn)  – 3:13
"A Brown Bird Singing" (Royden Barrie, Haydn Wood)  – 2:59
"I Don't Want to Play in Your Yard" (Henry W. Petrie, Philip Wingate)  – 2:32
"The Maid With the Flaxen Hair" (Claude Debussy)  – 1:00
"The Wearing of the Green" (Traditional)  – 2:32
"Chaconde (Le Bon Petit Roi d' Yvetot)" (Marcel Grandjany)  – 1:38
Chinese Love Poems: "Going Rowing"/"Like the Moon"/"The Music" (Po)/(Po)/(Po)  – 2:46
"The Riddle Song" (Traditional)  – 3:55
"The Gold Wedding Ring" (Lee, Harry Sukman)  – 2:16

Personnel
 Peggy Lee – vocals
 Stella Castellucci – harp
 Gene DiNovi – harpsichord

References

1958 albums
Peggy Lee albums
Albums produced by Milt Gabler
Decca Records albums